AaFK Fortuna (formerly known as FK Fortuna Ålesund) is a Norwegian women's football club from Ålesund that currently competes in 2. divisjon, the third tier of Norwegian football. It is named after Fortuna of Roman mythology.

History

The club was founded on 25 August 1991 by outbreakers from SK Guard, and merged with Spjelkavik IL in 1995. They played as Spjelkavik IL/Fortuna in the 1995 season, and was named FK Fortuna Ålesund in 1996. The club's home grounds are Aksla Stadion and (sometimes) Color Line Stadion.

After playing 1995–2008 at the second level, the club was promoted and debuted in the 2009 Toppserien, but finished in last position and was relegated. Fortuna was in the second tier in the period 2010–16 and has played in the third tier since 2017.

Among several coaches, Tone Haugen was playing coach and captain 2000–03 and the ex-Icelandic national team coach Helena Ólafsdóttir was coach for Fortuna 2015–16.

2020 Aalesunds FK agreement
Ahead of the 2020 season, Fortuna Ålesund agreed to a three-year cooperation agreement with Aalesunds FK (AaFK). One of the goals are to develop women's football in Ålesund and eventually merge Fortuna with AaFK. As part of the agreement, the team changed its name to AaFK Fortuna and will play with Aalesunds FK's orange and blue kit and use AaFK's logo.

Current squad

}

Recent seasons
{|class="wikitable"
|-bgcolor="#efefef"
! Season
! 
! Pos.
! Pl.
! W
! D
! L
! GS
! GA
! P
!Cup
!Notes
|-
|2000
|1. divisjon
|align=right|1
|align=right|18||align=right|16||align=right|1||align=right|1
|align=right|96||align=right|24||align=right|49
||Third round
|Lost promotion play-offs
|-
|2001
|1. divisjon
|align=right|6
|align=right|16||align=right|6||align=right|2||align=right|8
|align=right|34||align=right|33||align=right|20
||Third round
|
|-
|2002
|1. divisjon
|align=right|6
|align=right|16||align=right|6||align=right|2||align=right|8
|align=right|21||align=right|28||align=right|20
||Quarter-finals
|
|-
|2003
|1. divisjon
|align=right|6
|align=right|18||align=right|7||align=right|4||align=right|7
|align=right|32||align=right|29||align=right|25
||Third round
|
|-
|2004
|1. divisjon
|align=right|5
|align=right|18||align=right|9||align=right|0||align=right|9
|align=right|49||align=right|57||align=right|27
||Third round
|
|-
|2005
|1. divisjon
|align=right|5
|align=right|18||align=right|7||align=right|4||align=right|7
|align=right|29||align=right|29||align=right|25
||Quarter-finals
|
|-
|2006
|1. divisjon
|align=right |6
|align=right|18||align=right|7||align=right|3||align=right|8
|align=right|25||align=right|32||align=right|24
||Second round
|
|-
|2007
|1. divisjon
|align=right|4
|align=right|18||align=right|8||align=right|3||align=right|7
|align=right|31||align=right|23||align=right|27
||Third round
|
|-
|2008
|1. divisjon
|align=right bgcolor=#DDFFDD| 2
|align=right|18||align=right|8||align=right|4||align=right|6
|align=right|32||align=right|22||align=right|28
|Quarter-finals
|Promoted
|-
|2009
|Toppserien
|align=right bgcolor="#FFCCCC"| 12
|align=right|22||align=right|0||align=right|3||align=right|19
|align=right|18||align=right|87||align=right|3
|Third round
|Relegated
|-
|2010
|1. divisjon
|align=right|4
|align=right|22||align=right|11||align=right|4||align=right|7
|align=right|45||align=right|32||align=right|37
|Third round
|
|-
|2011
|1. divisjon
|align=right|7
|align=right|20||align=right|7||align=right|2||align=right|11
|align=right|42||align=right|52||align=right|23
|Third round
|
|-
|2012
|1. divisjon
|align=right |9
|align=right|22||align=right|7||align=right|3||align=right|12
|align=right|35||align=right|54||align=right|24
|Second round
|
|-
|2013
|1. divisjon
|align=right|7
|align=right|20||align=right|8||align=right|5||align=right|7
|align=right|38||align=right|35||align=right|29
|Third round
|
|-
|2014
|1. divisjon
|align=right|4
|align=right|22||align=right|11||align=right|4||align=right|7
|align=right|44||align=right|32||align=right|37
|Third round
|
|-
|2015
|1. divisjon
|align=right|9
|align=right|22||align=right|6||align=right|4||align=right|12
|align=right|30||align=right|51||align=right|22
|Third round
|
|-
|2016
|1. divisjon
|align=right bgcolor="#FFCCCC"| 11
|align=right|22||align=right|4||align=right|5||align=right|13
|align=right|25||align=right|53||align=right|17
|First round
|Relegated
|-
|2017
|2. divisjon
|align=right|1
|align=right|18||align=right|14||align=right|3||align=right|1
|align=right|64||align=right|20||align=right|45
|Second round
|Lost promotion play-offs
|-
|2018
|2. divisjon
|align=right|1
|align=right|18||align=right|13||align=right|3||align=right|2
|align=right|60||align=right|13||align=right|42
|Second round
|Lost promotion play-offs
|-
|2019
|2. divisjon
|align=right|2
|align=right|16||align=right|12||align=right|1||align=right|3
|align=right|73||align=right|16||align=right|37
|Third round
|
|}

Coaches

References

External links
Official site 

Women's football clubs in Norway
Association football clubs established in 1991
Sport in Ålesund
1991 establishments in Norway